The Sleeping Woman is an upcoming Spanish supernatural horror thriller film directed by Laura Alvea which stars Almudena Amor and Javier Rey alongside Amanda Goldsmith.

Plot 
The plot concerns about a love triangle, following Ana, an auxiliary nurse developing a romantic attraction towards Agustín (the husband of the patient in a vegetative state she is in charge of taking care). Ana is ensuingly disturbed by supernatural developments around her.

Cast 
 Almudena Amor as Ana
 Javier Rey as Agustín
 Amanda Goldsmith

Production 
The film was produced by La Claqueta PC and Coming Soon Films with the participation of RTVE and TVE3 and support from ICAA and Junta de Andalucía. Shooting locations included the island of Gran Canaria and Seville.

Release 
Distributed by Filmax, the film's theatrical release in Spain is tentatively expected for 2023.

See also 
 List of Spanish films of 2023

References 

Spanish horror thriller films
Spanish supernatural horror films
La Claqueta PC films
Upcoming films
Films shot in the province of Seville
Films shot in the Canary Islands
Films about nurses
Upcoming Spanish-language films